Wilhelm Ramsay (20 January 1865 – 6 January 1928) was a Finland Swede geologist. He became a member of the Royal Swedish Academy of Sciences in 1914 and in 1915 was accepted into the Royal Physiographic Society in Lund. He coined the terms Fennoscandia (1900) and Postjotnian (1909). Ramsay also coined the term ijolite.

Together with Jakob Sederholm, Ramsay was a student of Fredrik Johan Wiik. Pentti Eskola was a student of Ramsay.

References

1865 births
1928 deaths
Finnish geologists
Tectonicists
Members of the Royal Swedish Academy of Sciences
Members of the Royal Physiographic Society in Lund
Swedish-speaking Finns